Łapczyca  is a village in southern Poland, situated in Lesser Poland Voivodeship (since 1999), previously in Tarnów Voivodeship (1975-1998).

References

Villages in Bochnia County